is a Japanese long-distance runner. He competed in the 10,000 metres at the 2015 World Championships in Beijing.

International competitions

Personal bests
Outdoor
5000 metres – 13:12.63 (Heusden-Zolder 2015)
10,000 metres – 27:29.74 (Machida 2015)
Indoor
3000 metres – 8:11.73 (Hangzhou 2014)

References

External links

1990 births
Living people
Place of birth missing (living people)
Japanese male long-distance runners
Competitors at the 2011 Summer Universiade
World Athletics Championships athletes for Japan
Japan Championships in Athletics winners
21st-century Japanese people